Marshall Reese Mauldin (November 5, 1914 – September 2, 1990) was a third baseman in Major League Baseball. He played for the Chicago White Sox in 1934.

References

External links

1914 births
1990 deaths
Major League Baseball third basemen
Chicago White Sox players
Players of American football from Atlanta